Snowboard Addiction – Fun Ride is a compilation album mostly of Hardcore Punk artists from USA, and UK.  It was originally released in 1994 in Japan as a 24-song CD.  The album was compiled by New Red Archives and J!mco Records. The American version Hardcore Breakout USA was compiled and released in 1990.

Track listing
Fun Ride
 "Jolt" - Ultraman 1:58
 "Rich" - Jawbreaker 2:58
 "Indigestion" - Samiam 2:41
 "Stand Up And Fight" - Bedlam Hour 1:50
 "Shave Clean" - Crucial Youth 0:53
 "Full On" - Hogan's Heroes 1:24
 "New Queen" - Samiam 2:23
 "Those Who Curse" - Crucial Youth 1:19
 "Zombies" - Kraut 1:55
 "You Popped My Life" - G Whizz 2:37
 "Threat Of Power" - Squat 2:06
 "Its About Time" - Agitators 1:40
 "Turn To Ice" - Ultraman 2:14
 "Home Sweet Home" - Samiam 1:53
 "Unemployed" - Kraut 2:17
 "Positive Dental Outlook" - Crucial Youth 0:51
 "Megalopolis" - UK Subs 1:55
 "Breaking Your Rules" - Hogan's Heroes 3:59
 "Underground" - Samiam 3:40
 "Sabre Dance" - UK Subs 3:13
 "Reagan Youth" - Reagan Youth 1:19
 "Last Will" - Hogan's Heroes 1:49
 "Juvenile Justice" - Kraut 2:17
 "Frog Song" - P.E.D. 0:49

Reception

References

1994 compilation albums
Hardcore punk compilation albums
1994 albums
Metalcore compilation albums